Tajuria illurgis, the white royal, is a butterfly in the family Lycaenidae. It is found in Asia.

The larvae feed on Taxillus nigrans and Taxillus rhododendricolius.

Subspecies
Tajuria illurgis illurgis (Bhutan, Assam, northern Thailand, Yunnan)
Tajuria illurgis tattaka (Araki, 1949) (Taiwan)

References

Butterflies described in 1869
Tajuria
Butterflies of Asia
Taxa named by William Chapman Hewitson